Taloye is a rural locality (a selo) in Tunkinsky District, Republic of Buryatia, Russia. The population was 183 as of 2010. There are 3 streets.

Geography 
Taloye is located 51 km northeast of Kyren (the district's administrative centre) by road. Khuray-Khobok is the nearest rural locality.

References 

Rural localities in Tunkinsky District